The Cathedral of St. Mary of the Assumption, also known simply as  St. Mary’s Cathedral,  is the Catholic cathedral in Trenton, New Jersey, United States.  Along with the Co-Cathedral of St. Robert Bellarmine in Freehold, it is the seat of the Diocese of Trenton.

History

The Rev. Anthony Smith purchased the property on which St. Mary’s Cathedral now sits in 1865 from Dr. Jacob Quick.  The location had been a part of the battlefield during the Battle of Trenton in the American Revolutionary War. A historical marker on the rectory identifies the location as the place where Hessian Commander Col. Johann Gottlieb Rall died on December 27, 1776.

St. Mary's was the second Catholic parish established in Trenton after St. John's, which was located on the present site of Sacred Heart Church on South Broad Street.  Ground was broken for the parish church on April 23, 1866, and it was dedicated on January 1, 1871 by Bishop James Roosevelt Bayley of Newark. The spire was completed by Joseph Trier, a Trenton contractor, in 1879.  It was said to be the tallest church spire in the state at that time.  The clock in the tower was built by the Seth Thomas Clock Company for the Paris Exposition of 1878 where it served as the official time piece.

The Diocese of Trenton was established by Pope Leo XIII on August 2, 1881.  St. Mary’s Church was chosen to be the cathedral of the new diocese.  Bishop Michael J. O'Farrell was consecrated on Cardinal John McCloskey at St. Patrick's Cathedral in New York City and enthroned in St. Mary's on November 17, 1881.

The gymnasium and convent were built around 1900.

The spire was in danger of collapsing and it was removed in 1956.  A couple of months later the cathedral itself, and the attached rectory, were destroyed in a fire on March 14, 1956.  It claimed the lives of Msgr. Richard T. Crean, the cathedral rector, and housekeepers Mary Brennan and Mary Donnellan.  The present cathedral church was dedicated three years later on March 14, 1959 by Bishop George W. Ahr at a Pontifical Mass celebrated by Newark Archbishop Thomas A. Boland.  The attached rectory was completed at the same time.

Architecture

The exterior of the present St. Mary's Cathedral is composed of Mount Airy granite. The structure is a Modern interpretation of the Romanesque style. The former cathedral tower held ten bells of various sizes and tones. While they were warped and blackened by the fire, they were restored and rehung in the present cathedral tower. They are played electronically from a keyboard that is located near the organ. The clock, which was also in the former cathedral, was restored and put in the present cathedral. Its original mechanism was controlled by weights and pulleys and it too is now operated electrically. Other elements from the former cathedral that were incorporated into the present cathedral include the bronze doors, the altar rails and parts of the original stained glass windows.

The façade features statues of the Twelve Apostles.

See also
List of Catholic cathedrals in the United States
List of cathedrals in the United States

References

External links

Official Cathedral Site
Diocese of Trenton Official Site

Roman Catholic Diocese of Trenton
Mary of the Assumption, Saint, Trenton
Churches in Trenton, New Jersey
Religious organizations established in 1865
Roman Catholic churches completed in 1959
Tourist attractions in Trenton, New Jersey
1865 establishments in New Jersey
20th-century Roman Catholic church buildings in the United States